Sugith Varughese (born 25 April 1957) is an Indian-born Canadian writer, director and actor.

Background
Born in Cochin, Kerala, India into a Syriac Saint Thomas Christian family ("Varughese," also sometimes spelled "Varghese" and "Verghese" and variously pronounced, is Syriac-Malayalam for "George"), he immigrated to Saskatoon, Saskatchewan as a child when his neurosurgeon father obtained a professional appointment there. His family's native language is Malayalam; having grown up in anglophone western Canada he naturally speaks English with a Canadian accent but from time to time affects an assortment of South Asian accents when playing dramatic roles that call for them.

Sugith Varughese was raised in Saskatoon, Saskatchewan, began university studies at the University of Saskatchewan in Saskatoon with a double major in pre-medicine and drama, and continued on to an undergraduate degree in drama at the University of Minnesota in Minneapolis and a Master of Fine Arts at York University in Toronto. He went on to write, act in and direct film and television productions in Canada and the USA. He was the first visible minority accepted to attend the Canadian Film Centre as a writer-director.  As a director, he has been nominated for and won several Canadian film and television and international film festival awards. He also holds a black belt in karate.

Credits

His credits include the following.

Acting
As a film and television actor: 
 More than 100 film and TV credits including "Orphan", "Solar Attack" (as the character Patel), and "Mission to Mars".  Other television credits include "Suits", "The Strain" and “Degrassi: The Next Generation”.  He was a series regular in the comedy CBC-TV's  "An American in Canada" aka "Frostbite" in Australia (Gemini nomination for Best Ensemble Performance) and played recurring characters in Omni TV's nighttime soap "Metropia", CBC-TV's "Little Mosque on the Prairie", season one of "The Girlfriend Experience" on Starz and “Kim's Convenience” on CBC-TV and Netflix, "Transplant" on CTV and NBC. He starred in "Home on the Range" for CBC-TV which won a gold prize for best TV pilot at the Houston Film Festival. He received an ACTRA Award nomination for his very first television role in the TV movie "Best of Both Worlds" for CBC-TV.
Other credits include Veritas: The Quest; F/X: The Series;  Kung Fu: The Legend Continues; Overdrawn at the Memory Bank; The Expanse. and played the role of the informant on season 1 of 72 Hours (Ep.1 Burning Obsession).

As a stage actor:
 "The Men in White (Factory Theatre)
 "Animal Farm" (Soulpepper Theatre)
 "Little Pretty and the Exceptional" (Factory Theatre) [Dora award nomination for Outstanding Performance-male], 
 "The Postman" (Panamania) [also co-writer], 
 "The Container" (Summerworks), 
 "The Post Office" (Pleiades Theatre)
 "Tideline" (Factory Theatre)
 "Bhopal" (Cahoots Theatre) and 
 "Indian Ink" (CanStage/National Arts Centre).

Writing

Stage 

 as playwright "The Postman" (co-writer, Panamania) and "Entitlement" (Summerworks)

Film and Television 

 As scriptwriter: Animated shorts, "Talespinners Collection 1", Talespinners Collection 2" (NFB); Short film, "Tongue Tied"; TV series "The Blobheads" (YTV, 1 episode); IMAX documentary "Lost Worlds: Life in the Balance"; TV series "Blue Murder" (Global TV, 2 episodes); TV series "Groundling Marsh" (YTV, 1 episode); TV series "On My Mind" (TVOntario, 1 episode); Short film "Mela's Lunch" (NFB); Short film "Kumar and Mr. Jones" (Canadian Film Centre); TV series "Mount Royal" (CTV, 1 episode); TV movie "Best of Both Worlds" (CBC); TV series "Fraggle Rock" (Jim Henson Company) (10 episodes); TV series "The Phoenix Team" (CBC, 1 episode); radio drama "In the Mountains" (CBC Radio) based on Rohinton Mistry's novel "A Fine Balance"; radio drama "Entry Denied" (CBC Radio) which was Canada's entry in the Worldplay Festival and broadcast worldwide.

Awards 
 Vaurghese has been nominated for a Writers Guild of Canada award five times and won a Writers Guild of Canada award for "Talespinners Collection 2" (NFB). He received a Gemini Award nomination for writing "The Secret Life of Goldfish".  He was a finalist for an ACTRA Award for writing "Best of Both Worlds". He won the first York Trillium Award – Most Promising Writer, Television from the Academy of Canadian Cinema and Television.

Directing
 "Tongue Tied" (independent comedy short)
 "On My Mind" (half-hour children's television series for TVOntario)
 "Mela's Lunch" (National Film Board of Canada) 
 “Kumar and Mr. Jones” (Canadian Film Centre) – awarded Best Director, Atlantic Film Festival

References

External links
 
 

1958 births
Male actors from Kochi
Male actors from Saskatoon
University of Minnesota College of Liberal Arts alumni
Canadian male film actors
Canadian male television actors
Canadian male voice actors
Canadian people of Malayali descent
Indian emigrants to Canada
Living people
Place of birth missing (living people)
Canadian male screenwriters
Writers from Kochi
Writers from Saskatoon
Canadian male actors of Indian descent
Canadian Film Centre alumni
20th-century Canadian screenwriters
20th-century Canadian male writers
21st-century Canadian screenwriters
21st-century Canadian male writers